Kruševica can refer to the following places:

 Bosnia and Herzegovina
Kruševica (Lukavac), village near Lukavac
Kruševica (Ljubinje), village near Ljubinje
Kruševica (river), right tributary of Vrbanja river

 Croatia
Kruševica (Slavonski Šamac), village near Slavonski Šamac

 North Macedonia
Kruševica, Prilep, village near Prilep
Kruševica, Rosoman, village near Kavadarci

 Serbia
Kruševica (mountain) in southern Serbia
Kruševica (Lazarevac), village near Lazarevac
Kruševica (Prokuplje), village near Prokuplje
Kruševica (Raška), village near Raška
Kruševica (Vlasotince), village near Vlasotnice
Mala Kruševica, village near Varvarin
Velika Kruševica, village near Rekovac
Donja Kruševica, village near Golubac